Bengt Roland Simonsen (born 23 March 1958 in Gothenburg, Västra Götaland) is a retired male racewalker from Sweden, who competed in three consecutive Summer Olympics for his native country, starting in 1976.

Achievements

References

1958 births
Living people
Swedish male racewalkers
Athletes (track and field) at the 1976 Summer Olympics
Athletes (track and field) at the 1980 Summer Olympics
Athletes (track and field) at the 1984 Summer Olympics
Olympic athletes of Sweden
Athletes from Gothenburg
20th-century Swedish people
21st-century Swedish people